Captain Eustace Hill  was an Anglican Padre of the South African Brigade during the First World War. He won the Military Cross for bravery at the Butte de Warlencourt where he lost his right hand. He was back at Longueval and Delville Wood in 1919 identifying and burying the dead of his Brigade. After the war he returned to St. John's College and became their headmaster from 1922 to 1930. He was responsible for the extension of the school's buildings and for the chapel which was dedicated as a war memorial, and contains one of the five crosses made from the remains of the trees at the battle of Delville Wood. Eustace Hill did not approve of contraception and converted to Catholicism in 1938. He became a monk in 1939, taking the name Brother James. He entered a monastery in Hampshire and remained there until his death on 12 February 1953.

Early life
Eustace St. Clair Hill was born on 15 February 1873 to Agnes Jane Pennell and James Turner Hill, a Major-General of the 4th Bengal Native Infantry. After attending school at Lancing College in Sussex, he went to Christ Church, Oxford where in 1895 he obtained his BA. Thereafter, he studied for the priesthood, being made a deacon in 1896 and being ordained as a priest in 1897. His first posting was as the Curate of Wrexham in North Wales. In 1898, he sailed to South Africa to become the chaplain of St Peter's Home, Grahamstown.

Boer War Service
In July 1899, after less than a year at St Peter's, Eustace Hill volunteered as a chaplain in the event of war breaking out between the Boers and the British. After the Boer War had broken out in September of that year, Hill was attached to Lord Methuen's column. This column was sent to relieve the siege of Kimberley and later Mafeking. During this time, he was involved in ministering to the British soldiers at Modder River and Magersfontein, two of the major battles in this theatre of the war. In April 1900 Hill became sick with fever and returned to England on three months' sick leave.

By the time he arrived back in South Africa in July 1900, Mafeking had been relieved and Pretoria had fallen. The Boer War had become a guerilla war. The British forces roamed the countryside trying to pin the Boer forces down by trapping them between two forces and by depriving them of local support through the destruction of their farms and houses, and through the internment of their families. Padre Hill was involved in supporting these roving groups though he was not popular by his insistence on preventing any looting or maltreatment of the Boers.

After the Boer War
In April 1901, Eustace Hill was appointed Assistant Chaplain to the Railway Mission at Naauwpoort in the Eastern Cape, as well as being responsible for ministering to the soldiers of the nearby military camp. In 1904 he joined the Community of the Resurrection, an Anglican religious order that had been founded in 1892. In 1905 he was appointed to the staff of St John's College in Johannesburg. He took a leave of absence from the school in 1906 to support the colonial forces involved in suppressing the Bambata rebellion.

Chaplain on the Western Front
Again Padre Hill was one of the first to volunteer his services as a military chaplain in 1914. He initially saw action at Luderitz in South West Africa with the SA Expeditionary Force. He was then involved in the Senussi campaign in Egypt the following year. In 1916 he was transferred to Europe where he served on the Western Front. In July 1916 he was intimately involved in the Somme battles of Longueval and Delville Wood. At Butte de Warlencourt, he lost his right arm and was awarded the Military Cross in late 1916.

At Marrieres Wood on 24 March 1918, he was captured and served the remainder of the war as a prisoner of war. He was released in November 1918.

St John’s College
He returned to St. John's College and became their headmaster from 1922 to 1930. Though somewhat eccentric as a result of his war experiences, his elevation to the post brought a sense of vigour to the school. He was responsible for the extension of the school's buildings and particularly for the magnificent chapel which was dedicated in 1926. Fittingly, the chapel was dedicated as a war memorial and contains one of the five crosses made from the remains of the trees at the battle of Delville Wood.

Later life
In 1930 at the Seventh Lambeth Conference, the Anglican Church approved birth control under limited circumstances. Eustace Hill did not approve of contraception and converted to Catholicism in 1938. He became a monk in 1939, taking the name Brother James. He entered a monastery in Hampshire and remained there until his death on 12 February 1953, three days short of his eightieth birthday.
Padre Hill never married.

Bravery
Hill's bravery, coupled with an unshakeable belief in the rightness of what he was doing, meant that he had little concern for his own personal safety. He did not hesitate to take his very practical ministry to the front line and consequently became well known for his bravery. At Butte de Warlencourt, he received the third highest award for bravery, the Military Cross. 
Hill absolutely abhorred any form of cowardice and spent considerable effort exhorting his men to do their Christian duty under fire. He didn't question the purpose or shy away from the danger but rather exhorted the soldiers with words such as "Men, they may kill your bodies, but they cannot destroy your souls".

One example of his bravery was when, during the Boer War he received a curt note from Lord Methuen that "if he was seen in the front line again he would be sent home". On the Western Front, he was legendary for standing up and moving around the battlefield dodging artillery shells and machine gun bullets in pursuit of his ministry.

Hill the Military Chaplain
Though Padre Hill came from a distinguished military family and had a very rigid approach to the business of soldiering, he had a real vocation for the priesthood and particularly for the pastoral side of ministry. One is puzzled by the contrast between his keenness to participate in any military adventure with his very real concern for the suffering of the soldiers. Hill deplored war – he saw no glory in it but never questioned the rightness of it. In some respects, his absolute belief in the duty for all soldiers to fight like men and to die if necessary must have been the result of his family's military background and also because of the nature of the late Victorian Imperial culture in which he was born.

During the Boer War Padre Hill established an effective way for military chaplains to function within the military under conflict situations, and it was this experience that made him so much loved and respected by the troops and a national hero in the First World War.

Hill also campaigned for the establishment of an independent chaplaincy corps within the military.

Notes

References

 Gibbs, D.F. (1974): A Chaplain in the Boer War, Military History Journal Vol 3 No 2
 Great War Forum: https://www.greatwarforum.org/topic/102924-captain-eustace-hill/
 Hill, E.StC.: Boer War Diary, cited in Gibbs, D.F..
 Lawson, K. (1968): Venture of Faith, St John's College
 Millward, Jenni (2007): In St John's College Newsletter, Michaelmas Term
 Uys, Ian (1991): Rollcall – The Delville Wood Story, Ian Uys Publishers

1873 births
1953 deaths
People educated at Lancing College
English military chaplains
Anglican priest converts to Roman Catholicism
20th-century English Anglican priests
English Christian monks
19th-century Christian monks
20th-century Christian monks
Boer War chaplains
World War I chaplains
Recipients of the Military Cross